The Caddy Awards were awards handed out between 1974 and 2006 by the now-defunct Detroit Creative Directors Council, for notable advertising created in the Detroit area.  The D Awards replaced the Caddy Awards in 2007.

References

Further reading
 
 
 
 

Advertising awards